Hellier is a digital documentary series directed by Karl Pfeiffer, under the banner of Planet Weird, that aims to explore a string of synchronicities that take place in Hellier, Kentucky. The first season, which consisted of five episodes, was released for free on January 18, 2019, on YouTube and other platforms on a pay-what-you-want model. The second season, which consisted of ten episodes, was released first on Amazon Prime Video on November 29, 2019 and later on YouTube on December 13, 2019.

Season one 
The first season began when a team of paranormal investigators received a report on hobgoblins in Hellier, Kentucky. After a series of emails with an alleged Doctor by the name of David, the team traveled to Hellier to investigate the doctor's claims. After thorough investigation, they found that no one in the town had ever heard of the doctor and that records of him did not exist. They also began receiving messages from a mysterious Terry Wriste who goads them to investigate further.

Season two 
The second season focuses its investigation on the identity of Terry Wriste and other paranormal events that took place in Kentucky. They meet a woman who claims to have contact with Indrid Cold, an alien who is alleged to have visited earth and has a connection to Mothman. They also meet with paranormal author Allen Greenfield and discuss their investigation. The team travels to Somerset, Kentucky and visited the International Paranormal Museum and Research Center, and talked with its owner Kyle Kadel. They donated some items to the museum, including a lantern used on ghost hunts in season 1.

Season three 
A third season of Hellier is speculated, but not confirmed. Greg Newkirk, executive producer, has said in an interview that the show could end on season two. However, he also claimed that a third season is likely, but will not happen in the near future.

Reception 
The first season of Hellier was released to positive reviews and viewed by over a million people. The second season had a more mixed response, with critics finding the story to be confusing; however, the cinematography was still almost universally praised.

In popular media 

 Hellier has been mentioned several times on The Last Podcast on the Left, with a full review being done on the February 6, 2019 episode, Side Stories: Metal Health.
 The first and second season of Hellier was covered in an interview format on the Mysterious Universe podcast.

References 

Paranormal television
Amazon Prime Video original programming
2019 American television series debuts
American documentary television series